Dhok Gohar Shah is a village in Rawalpindi District in the Punjab province of Pakistan.

This place is famous for being the birthplace of Riaz Ahmed Gohar Shahi (ریاض احمد گوھرشاہی), a Pakistani author and spiritual leader and founder of Mehdi Foundation International.

The Mausoleum of Syed Ali Gohar Shah, also known Baba Gohar Ali Shah, is also in Dhok Gohar Shah, who was an ancestor of Riaz Ahmed Gohar Shahi. Originally he was from Kashmir, however, later he migrated to a suburb of Rawalpindi near Gujar Khan, the place is dedicated to his name and called Dhok Gohar Shah means village of Gohar Shah.

Populated places in Rawalpindi District